Agonopterix ramosella is a moth in the family Depressariidae. It was described by Stainton in 1867. It is found in Armenia and the Alay Mountains.

References

Moths described in 1867
Agonopterix
Moths of Asia